The Proud Family is an American animated television series that aired on Disney Channel from September 15, 2001 to August 19, 2005. Originally pitched to Nickelodeon, it was eventually picked up by Disney Channel in 2001. The show was created by Walt Disney Animation Studios animator Bruce W. Smith, and produced by his studio, Jambalaya Studios. 

The Proud Family is about an African-American family and presents young audiences with different daily situations that many teenagers might have to face during their teenage and adult years. A television film, The Proud Family Movie, was released on August 19, 2005, ended the series, which ran for two seasons.

Series overview

Episodes

Season 1 (2001–02)

Season 2 (2002–05)

Crossover (2005)

TV movie (2005)

References

Proud Family, The
Lists of Disney Channel television series episodes